The following is a list of offers made on the British reality television series Dragons' Den in Series 1–10, originally aired during 2005–2012. 104 episodes of Dragons' Den were broadcast consisting of at least 754 pitches. A total of 129 pitches were successful, with 26 offers from the dragons rejected by the entrepreneurs and 599 failing to receive an offer of investment.

Series overview

Successful pitches

Series 1

Series 2

Series 3

Series 4

Series 5

Series 6

Series 7

Series 8

Series 9

Series 10

Rejected offers

Series 1

Series 2

Series 3

Series 4

Series 5

Series 6

Series 7

Series 9

Series 10

Failed Pitches

Series 1

Series 2

Series 3

Series 4

Series 5

Series 6

Series 7

Series 8

Series 9

Series 10

References

British television-related lists